Saliva is the debut studio album by American nu-metal band Saliva. The album was recorded in the summer of 1997 at Rockingchair Recording Studios in Memphis, Tennessee and released on Rockingchair Records on August 26, 1997.

Re-Issue (2003)
Following the major record label success of the band, after the release of Every Six Seconds (2001) and Back Into Your System (2002), Rockingchair Records made a manufacturing and distribution deal with Diamond Productions and RED Distribution imprint RUMM (RED Urban Music Marketing). The re-issue came out in 2003 with identical audio content but featured updated artwork. The front cover was completely redesigned and features a woman's face with her eyes closed, playing off the artwork of Every Six Seconds. The CD face was also altered from an all-black background on the original to a crackled texture on the re-issue. The booklet and back cover remained mostly identical with few exceptions; a different font was used for the text, the alignment was improved, the contact information was changed and there is a slight color shade difference: while the original issue had a more blue-ish gray tone, the re-issue has a more green-ish gray tone. The re-issue version's artwork was also designed and updated by Brandon Seavers, who had by this time bought out the multi-media company Audio MasterWorks with Mark Yoshida and renamed it AudioGraphic MasterWorks.

Appearances
Four songs originally recorded for Saliva were later re-recorded with producer Bob Marlette and mixed by John Goodmanson and Steve Thompson as part of the band's major record label Island Records debut Every Six Seconds in 2000. The four songs were Beg, Greater Than Less Than, Pin Cushion and 800. Beg and Greater Than Less Than appeared on Every Six Seconds, however Pin Cushion and 800 were cut from the album and kept as b-sides. The re-recording of Pin Cushion appeared on the soundtrack to the Canadian werewolf horror film Ginger Snaps in 2000, while 800 appeared on the soundtrack to the American horror film Resident Evil in 2002.

When Saliva released its greatest hits compilation Moving Forward in Reverse: Greatest Hits in 2010, Saliva was the only release not to be showcased.

Track listing

Personnel
Credits are adapted from the album's liner notes.

Saliva
 Josey Scott – vocals
 Todd Poole – drums, vocals
 Wayne Swinny – guitar
 Chris D'Abaldo – guitar
 Dave Novotny – bass

Artwork
 Brandon Seavers – art direction, layout, design
 Steve Roberts – photography

Production
 Bill Pappas – production, mixing, engineering
 Saliva – production, engineering
 Mark Yoshida – executive producer
 Jeff Speight – mastering
 Bryan Coleman – management
 Jim Zumwalt – legal affairs for Saliva
 Dave Moser – legal affairs for Rockingchair Records

References

Saliva (band) albums
1997 debut albums